Eupithecia parcirufa is a moth in the  family Geometridae. It is found in Bolivia.

References

Moths described in 1906
parcirufa
Moths of South America